Günther Osche (also spelled Guenther Osche, born 7 August 1926 in Neustadt an der Weinstraße, died 2 February 2009 in Freiburg im Breisgau) was a German evolutionary biologist, ecologist and parasitologist.

He started his career with a research on nematodes having Hans-Jürgen Stammer (1899-1968) as his scientific supervisor. He is known to have raised the name Rhabditides elegans in the subgenus Caenorhabditis in 1952 in the history of the naming of the model worm Caenorhabditis elegans.

Works

Articles 
 Systematik und Phylogenie der Gattung Rhabditis (Nematoda). G. Osche, Zool. Jb. (Abt. 1), 81, pages 190–280, 1952
 Die Bedeutung der Osmoregulation und des Winkverhaltens für freilebende Nematoden. G. Osche, Zoomorphology, 1952
 Bau, Entwicklung und systematische Bedeutung der Cordons der Acuariidae (Nematoda) am Beispiel von Stammerinema soricis (Tiner 1951) gen. nov. G. Osche, Zeitschrift für Parasitenkunde, 1955
 Die bursa-und schwanzstrukturen und ihre aberrationen bei den strongylina (Nematoda) morphologische studien zum problem der pluri-und … G. Osche, Zeitschrift für Morphologie und ökologie der Tiere, 1958

Books 
 Die Welt der Parasiten. Zur Naturgeschichte des Schmarotzertums. 1966
 Das "Wesen" der biologischen Evolution. 1973
 Evolution. Grundlagen - Erkenntnisse - Entwicklungen der Abstammungslehre. 1979
 with von Arno Bogenrieder, Klaus-Günter Collatz, Hans Kössel : Lexikon der Biologie in acht Bänden. 1985

Tributes 
The genus of nematodesOscheius is a tribute to G. Osche.

References 

20th-century German zoologists
1926 births
2009 deaths
People from Neustadt an der Weinstraße